Pelton Dam is a major dam on the Deschutes River in Jefferson County, Oregon, owned and operated as a hydroelectric facility by Portland General Electric, one element of its Pelton Round Butte Project on the Deschutes.

Upstream, to the south, Pelton Dam impounds the waters of the Deschutes to create the deep Lake Simtustus in a relatively narrow canyon about  back to the 1964 Round Butte Dam. The name "Simtustus" honors a native who scouted for the U.S. Army during the 1867–68 campaign against the Paiutes.

The area between is called the Pelton Regulating Reservoir. In 1982 the Confederated Tribes of Warm Springs installed a hydroelectric turbine unit in the regulating dam for additional power. Between 2000 and 2005 the CTWS also asserted itself as a stakeholder in the project's re-licensing negotiations between Portland General Electric and the Federal Energy Regulatory Commission, winning key environmental, cultural, and water rights concessions.

References 

Dams in Oregon
Reservoirs in Oregon
Portland General Electric dams
Buildings and structures in Jefferson County, Oregon
Arch dams
Hydroelectric power plants in Oregon
Dams completed in 1958
Energy infrastructure completed in 1958
1958 establishments in Oregon
Dams on the Deschutes River (Oregon)
Lakes of Jefferson County, Oregon